Raviscanina is a comune (municipality) in the Province of Caserta in the Italian region Campania, located about  north of Naples and about  north of Caserta.

Raviscanina borders the following municipalities: Ailano, Pietravairano, Prata Sannita, Sant'Angelo d'Alife, Vairano Patenora, Valle Agricola.

History
The city was the fief of Count Richard of Rupecanina.

Main sights
In the nearby are the ruins of the castle of Rupecanina, built by the Normans over a pre-existing Samnite fortress.

References

Cities and towns in Campania
Castles in Italy